Hamilton Evans "Tony" James (born February 3, 1951) is an American billionaire businessman, and the executive vice chairman of The Blackstone Group, a New York-based global asset management firm, having previously been president and chief operating officer. James has been chairman of Costco since August 2017.

Early life and education 
James was born in Wyandotte, Michigan. He is the son of Hamilton Renson James and Waleska James. He grew up as the oldest of four boys in Lincoln, Massachusetts, a suburb of Boston. His father was a management consultant, president of Arthur D. Little International, and a vice president of Arthur D. Little, Inc.

James attended The Choate School (now Choate Rosemary Hall) in Wallingford, Connecticut.

James attended Harvard College, where he was a John Harvard Scholar, and graduated magna cum laude in 1973. He earned an MBA from Harvard Business School in 1975, where he was a Baker Scholar.

Career 
In 1975, James joined investment bank Donaldson, Lufkin & Jenrette and became head of its global M&A group in 1982. He founded DLJ Merchant Banking, Inc in 1985. In 1995, James was appointed chairman of the firm's banking group, a position he held when DLJ was acquired in 2000 by Credit Suisse First Boston, and was a member of its board of directors. At CSFB, James served on the executive board and as chairman of global investment banking and private equity. A 2007 Wall Street Journal article credited James with leading the acquisition process, on behalf of DLJ.

In 2002, James joined global alternative asset manager The Blackstone Group, where he was president and chief operating officer. He is on the firm's executive and management committees, and its board of directors. He has been credited with reorganizing Blackstone's management and creating its executive committee.

James was directly implicated in a 2007 corporate collusion conspiracy among fellow private equity giants Bain Capital and Carlyle Group. Alongside Blackstone, these firms rigged bids in 19 leveraged buyouts and eight other transactions. James wrote in an email to KKR co-founder George Roberts “Together we can be unstoppable but in opposition we can cost each other a lot of money.” James also sent a note to his Blackstone colleagues about the co-founder of another private equity group, KKR: “Henry Kravis just called to say congratulations and that they were standing down because he had told me before they would not jump a signed deal of ours.” Though the PE firms tried to dismiss the case, a federal judge denied their motion. Ultimately, the case was settled out of court in 2014. The firms paid the plaintiffs about $600 million.

He was the mastermind behind Blackstone's acquisition of GSO Capital Partners, now Blackstone's credit division.

In his public relations duties for Blackstone James created the idea of a private equity trade group to lobby Washington. He initially called it the Private Equity Council, but it was later changed to the American Investment Council.

In August 2017, James was appointed chairman of Costco after the death of co-founder and long-time chairman Jeffrey Brotman.

As of April 2018, Forbes reported his net worth at $1.93 billion.

Politics 

In 2008 James became a regular donor and fundraiser host for Barack Obama. In May 2012, James, a Democrat, hosted a fundraiser at his home in New York for President Barack Obama, raised more than $2 million for the President's reelection campaign. Obama offered James the job of Commerce Secretary but he ultimately turned it down.

James also serves on the board of the Center for American Progress (CAP), a progressive public policy research and advocacy organization. has made annual donations of at least $50,000 to the think tank since 2014.

In 2015, James was appointed to the Port Authority Board of Commissioners despite his lack of experience with transportation issues, and in spite of Blackstone recently having purchased half of fellow commissioner Scott Rechler’s New York real estate portfolio.

In November 2020 he was named Co-Chair of the Board of the Metropolitan Museum of Art with Candace Beinecke, effective January 12, 2021, the first time the museum had two chairs.

Personal life 
In August 1973, James married Amabel George Boyce, the daughter of Mr and Mrs John Cowman George Boyce of Lutherville and Wequetonsing, Michigan. They have three children, daughters Meredith Evans and Rebecca Lee and son Hamilton Boyce.

In 2011, it was confirmed that James had spent $24.9 million on an apartment at 834 Fifth Avenue, New York City, previously owned by Hal Prince, having lived at 1001 Park Avenue since the 1980s.

See also 
Stephen A. Schwarzman

References

1951 births
American billionaires
American chairpersons of corporations
American chief operating officers
Choate Rosemary Hall alumni
Living people
Harvard Business School alumni
Harvard College alumni